Dalmaniturus is a genus of trilobites in the order Phacopida, that existed during the lower Silurian in what is now western Mongolia. It was described by Chernysheva in 1937, and the type species is Dalmaniturus weberi.

References

External links
 Dalmaniturus at the Paleobiology Database

Dalmanitidae
Phacopida genera
Fossil taxa described in 1937
Silurian trilobites of Asia
Fossils of Mongolia